Live and Pickin' is the title of a recording by Doc Watson and Merle Watson, released in 1979.

Live and Pickin' is out-of-print and was re-issued in 2003 by Southern Music packaged with Doc and the Boys.

At the Grammy Awards of 1980 "Big Sandy/Leather Britches" won the Grammy Award for Best Country Instrumental Performance.

Track listing
 "Dig a Little Deeper in the Well" (Roger Bowling, Jody Emerson) – 3:33
 "Milk Cow Blues" (Kokomo Arnold) – 5:03
 "Wild Bill Joes" (Traditional) – 2:55
 "Memories of You Dear" (Harley Huggins) – 2:40
 "Daybreak Blues (Blue Yodel No. 12)" (Jimmie Rogers) – 4:01
 "Big Sandy/Leather Britches" (Traditional) – 1:50
 "Let the Cocaine Be" (Traditional) – 2:32
 "All I Have to Do Is Dream" (Felice Bryant, Boudleaux Bryant) – 2:50
 "Got the Blues (Can't Be Satisfied)" (Mississippi John Hurt) – 3:31
 "St. James Hospital/Frosty Morn" (Traditional) – 6:30
 "Streamline Cannonball" (Roy Acuff) – 3:25
Additional tracks on the Southern Music release:
 "All I Have to Do Is Dream" (Felice Bryant, Boudleaux Bryant) – 3:08

Personnel
Doc Watson – vocals, guitar, harmonica
Merle Watson – guitar, dobro
T. Michael Coleman – bass, background vocals
Produced by Mitch Greenhill,
Recorded by Wally Heider Recording,
Engineer Biff Dawes

References

External links
 Doc Watson discography

1979 live albums
Doc Watson live albums
United Artists Records live albums